Second Redemption is a term that has been used regarding politics of the United States for the period following the election of 1968 characterized by more conservatism, and a retreat from governmental and judicial activism on issues of civil rights.

See also 
 White backlash
 Milliken v. Bradley (1974)
 Desegregation busing
 Reconstruction Era
 Redeemers
 Southern strategy
 American Civil War
 Civil Rights Movement
 Neoabolitionism

References 
  Kousser, J. Morgan, "The Supreme Court And The Undoing of the Second Reconstruction
 Joondeph, Bradley W., "A Second Redemption?" Washington and Lee Law Review,(Winter 1999).
 Gary Orfield, Susan E. Eaton, and the Harvard Project on School Desegregation, Dismantling Desegregation: The Quiet Reversal of Brown v. Board of Education. New York: The New Press, 1996.

History of civil rights in the United States
History of African-American civil rights